In military terms, 83rd Division or 83rd Infantry Division may refer to:

 Infantry divisions 
 83rd Infantry Division (German Empire) 
 83rd Infantry Division (Wehrmacht) 
 83rd Infantry Division (United States) 

 Cavalry divisions 
 83rd Cavalry Division (Soviet Union)

See also
 83rd Regiment (disambiguation)
 83rd Squadron (disambiguation)